IFK Aspudden-Tellus is a Swedish football club located in Stockholm.

Background
IFK Aspudden-Tellus currently plays in Division 2 Södra Svealand which is the fourth tier of  Swedish football. They play their home matches at Aspuddens IP in Stockholm.

The club is affiliated to Stockholms Fotbollförbund.

Footnotes

External links
 IFK Aspudden-Tellus – Official website

Football clubs in Stockholm
Aspudden-Tellus